Ståle Petter Lyngstadaas is a Norwegian professor and researcher with a focus on biomaterials and bone regeneration. Since 2013, he is the Vice-Dean of Research at Faculty of Dentistry, Oslo University He is the discoverer of Lyngstadaas syndrome.

References

External links 
 Curriculum vitae and publication list
 Department of Biomaterials (University of Oslo) - official website

Academic staff of the University of Oslo
Living people
Year of birth missing (living people)